Serdar Bali (born 21 July 1956) is a Turkish former professional footballer best known for his years with Trabzonspor and Beşiktaş.

Professional career
Bali was born in Istanbul where his father Zekeriya Bali was playing as a footballer. The family moved to his father's native Trabzon, where Bali started playing football professionally with Trabzonspor. In 5 seasons with them, he won 4 Süper Lig titles. In 1980, he transferred to Beşiktaş where he won his fifth Süper Lig league title in 1982. He returned to Trabzonspor in 1985, where he retired in 1988.

After retiring as a footballer, Bali worked in commerce -from 1996 to 2002 with his old club Trabzonspor in management. Since 2007, he has been a sports writer.

Honours
Trabzonspor
 Süper Lig: 1975-76, 1976-77, 1978-79, 1979-1980
 Turkish Cup: 1976-77, 1977-78
 Turkish Super Cup: 1975-76, 1976-77, 1978-79, 1979-1980
 Prime Minister's Cup: 1977-78

Beşiktaş
 Süper Lig: 1981-82

References

External links
TFF Profile
NFT Profile
Mackolik Profile

1956 births
Living people
Footballers from Istanbul
Turkish footballers
Turkey international footballers
Turkey youth international footballers
Association football midfielders
Süper Lig players
Trabzonspor footballers
Beşiktaş J.K. footballers
Denizlispor footballers